Five Ways to Save the World is a British documentary film on environmental issues related to climate change, released in 2006. The film was made by Karen O'Connor, for the big screen and was shot in the English language to reach an international audience. It includes interviews with five environmental scientists and experts including Paul Crutzen, James Roger Angel, John Latham, Ian Jones, and Klaus Lackner.

The "five ways" proposed are geoengineering techniques:
 space lenses in orbit, to diffract sunlight away from the earth
 cloud seeding with seawater to increase albedo
 sulfur launched into the stratosphere to increase albedo
 ocean fertilization with iron or urea (nitrogen fertilizer)
 artificial trees (see carbon capture and sequestration)

Since the first three methods do not remove carbon dioxide from the atmosphere, they would only reduce global warming but not ocean acidification. Since the last two methods would remove carbon dioxide, they could in theory reduce both global warming and ocean acidification.

External links
Five Ways to Save the World

2006 films
British documentary films
Documentary films about global warming
2006 documentary films
Climate engineering
2000s English-language films
2000s British films